Krabbendijke is a railway station located in Krabbendijke, The Netherlands. The station was opened on 1 July 1868 and is located on the Roosendaal–Vlissingen railway. The train service is operated by Nederlandse Spoorwegen.

Train service
The following services currently call at Krabbendijke:
2x per hour intercity service Amsterdam - Haarlem - Leiden - The Hague - Rotterdam - Dordrecht - Roosendaal - Vlissingen

Bus services

Bus Services 39, 43, 44, 45, 46, 47 and 194 stop at the station.

External links
NS website 
Dutch Public Transport journey planner 

Railway stations in Reimerswaal
Railway stations opened in 1868
Railway stations on the Staatslijn F